Land-Bonded Societies are acephalous societies that fall in between lineage-bonded societies and village-bonded societies.

Land-bonded societies are strictly agrarian, excluding inherently nomadic pastoralists from society.  They form from the fragments of lineage-bonded societies that merge, and their only claim to social ties is the land they occupy.

While definitively larger than lineage-bonded societies, land-bonded societies share many of the same traits, including the inability to support age-grade sets and secret societies.

As land-bonded societies grow larger, they can change into Village-bonded societies, which are able to simultaneously support age sets and secret societies, and enable them to transition to statehood.

Anthropological categories of peoples